Blas Elias (born August 18, 1967) is the drummer of the glam metal band Slaughter. He also drums for the Las Vegas production of Blue Man Group. He has toured with the Trans-Siberian Orchestra since 2017. He has been a rotating cast member of the Las Vegas production show Raiding the Rock Vault. In 2019 he returned to Slaughter as a full-time drummer.  Elias also starred in the 2001 movie Rock Star.

Biography
Blas Elias (née Blas Elias Gomez) is also an actor, having appeared in the movie Rock Star (2001). Elias played drummer Donny Johnson, of the fictional Steel Dragon tribute band, Blood Pollution. The film also featured performances by musicians such as Zakk Wylde, Jason Bonham, Myles Kennedy, Jeff Pilson, Brian Vander Ark, and Nick Catanese.

In 2000, Elias appeared in an instructional drumming video titled "Blas Elias of Slaughter - Drum Magic," for Star Licks Productions.

Elias at one time was endorsed by Ludwig Drums and Sabian Cymbals however neither company currently show him as an endorser. At one time, he had his own Signature series Drumstick Made by Pro Mark Drumsticks. As of 2015 into 2016, he is the drummer for Las Vegas-based band Sin City Sinners with Michael "Doc" Ellis, Joshua Alan, and Scott Griffin.

References

External links
 Official site
 Slaughterweb.com
 

Male actors from Texas
American male film actors
American rock drummers
Glam metal musicians
Musicians from Texas
Slaughter (band) members
1967 births
Living people
20th-century American drummers
American male drummers
People from Kenedy, Texas
Sin City Sinners members
Burning Rain members